New York World's Fair may refer to:

 1939 New York World's Fair
 1964 New York World's Fair